"Let's Twist Again" is a song written by Kal Mann and Dave Appell, and released as a single by Chubby Checker. One of the biggest hit singles of 1961, it reached No.8 on the U.S. Billboard pop chart (No.3 on Cash Box) in August of that year and subsequently reached No.2 in the UK in August 1961. The song refers to the Twist dance craze and Checker's 1960 single "The Twist", a two-time U.S. No.1 single (in September 1960 and again in January 1962 on re-release).

The song received the 1962 Grammy Award for Best Rock & Roll Recording. Checker also recorded the song in German as "Der Twist Beginnt" and in Italian as "Balliamo il Twist". A sample of "Der Twist Beginnt" would later be used by The Residents to begin their 1976 album The Third Reich 'n Roll. The song appears on the soundtrack of the 2011 film The Help.

Chart performance

Johnny Hallyday version (in French) 

The song was covered in French by Johnny Hallyday. His version (titled "Viens danser le twist") was released in 1961 and spent seven weeks in total at no. 1 on the singles sales chart in France (from 13 November to 13 December 1961 and from 13 January to 9 February 1962). In Wallonia (French Belgium) his single spent 40 weeks on the chart, also peaking at number 1.

Charts

See also
Twist songs

References

External links
Chubby Checker discography

1961 singles
Chubby Checker songs
Songs with lyrics by Kal Mann
Songs written by Dave Appell
The Isley Brothers songs
Johnny Hallyday songs
Twist (dance)
1961 songs
Cameo-Parkway Records singles
Sequel songs
Songs about dancing
Number-one singles in the Netherlands
Number-one singles in Belgium
Number-one singles in Sweden